Juresania is an extinct genus of brachiopod that existed from the Carboniferous to the Permian.

Description
Juresania's members were epifaunal, meaning they lived on top of the seafloor, not buried within it, and were suspension feeders.  They had small spines that cover both halves of the shell.

Distribution
Juresania specimens can be found in the Americas, Europe, and Asia, with most Juresania specimens having been found in the northern hemisphere.

Species
Species in the genus Rafinesquina include:

J. dorudensis Fantini Sestini, 1965
J. grandispinosa Li, 1986
J. hispida Chronic, 1949
J. juresanensis (Tschernyschew, 1902)
J. kolymaensis Zavodowsky, 1968
J. omanensis Hudson & Sudbury, 1959
J. ovalis (Dunbar & Condra, 1932)
J. rectangularia?
J. rituensis Sun, 1983
J. scalaris (Mansuy, 1913)
J. transversa Sun, 1991
J. tuotalaensis Sun, 1983

References

Prehistoric brachiopod genera
Carboniferous brachiopods
Permian brachiopods
Paleozoic animals of Asia
Paleozoic animals of Europe
Paleozoic animals of North America
Paleozoic animals of South America
Paleozoic brachiopods of Asia
Paleozoic brachiopods of Europe
Paleozoic brachiopods of North America
Paleozoic brachiopods of South America
Fossils of China
Fossils of Iran
Fossils of Japan
Fossils of Malaysia
Fossils of Oman
Fossils of Pakistan
Fossils of Peru
Fossils of Russia
Fossils of Spain
Fossils of Thailand
Fossils of Turkey
Fossils of the United States
Fossil taxa described in 1928